The Battle of Longewala (4–7 December 1971) was one of the first major engagements in the western sector during the Indo-Pakistani War of 1971, fought between assaulting Pakistani forces and Indian defenders at the Indian border post of Longewala, in the Thar Desert of Rajasthan state in India. The battle was fought between 120 Indian soldiers accompanied by four Hunter fighter aircraft and 2,000–3,000 Pakistani soldiers accompanied by 30–40 tanks.

A company of the Indian Army's 23rd Battalion, Punjab Regiment, commanded by Major Kuldip Singh Chandpuri, was left with the choice of either attempting to hold out until reinforced, or fleeing on foot from a Pakistani mechanised infantry force. Choosing the former, Chandpuri ensured that all his assets were correctly deployed and made the best use of his strong defensive position, as well as weaknesses created by errors in enemy tactics. He was also fortunate that an Indian Air Force forward air controller was able to secure and direct aircraft in support of the post's defence until reinforcements arrived six hours later.

The Pakistani commanders made several questionable decisions, including a failure of their strategic intelligence to foresee the availability of Indian strike aircraft in the Longewala area, exercising operational mobility with little or no route reconnaissance, and conducting a tactical frontal assault with no engineer reconnaissance. That led to the Pakistani brigade group being left extremely vulnerable to air attack and vehicles becoming bogged in terrain unsuitable for the movement of armoured vehicles, as they tried to deploy off a single track and were more susceptible to enemy fire since they used external fuel storage in tactical combat and attempted to execute a night attack over unfamiliar terrain, and infantry was surprised by obstacles to troop movement, which caused confusion and stalling the attack during the crucial hours of darkness, when the assaulting infantry still had a measure of concealment from Indian small arms and infantry support weapon fire.

Background 
The main thrust of the Indian Army during the 1971 war was directed towards the eastern theatre, with the western sector envisioned as a holding operation to prevent the Pakistan Army from achieving any success that would allow the President of Pakistan, Yahya Khan, any bargaining tool to trade against the captured territories in the east. By the last week of November 1971, the Indian Army had launched offensive manoeuvres at Atgram against Pakistani border posts and communications centres along the eastern border. The Mukti Bahini also launched an offensive against Jessore at this time. It was clear to Islamabad by this time that open conflict was inevitable, and that East Pakistan was indefensible in the long run. Yahya Khan chose at this point to try to protect Pakistan's integrity and to hold India by Ayub Khan's strategy—"The defence of East Pakistan lies in the West".

Prelude

The Western sector 

Khan's policy made the assumption that an open conflict with India would not last long due to international pressure, and that since East Pakistan was undefendable, the war effort should be concentrated on occupying as much Indian territory as possible as a bargaining tool at the negotiating table. To this end, Gen. Tikka Khan had proposed an offensive into India, and the PAF's "overriding priority was to give maximum support to this offensive". The initial plans for the offensive called for at least temporary air dominance by the PAF under which Khan's troops could conduct a lightning campaign deep into Western India before digging in and consolidating their positions. To support Khan's troops, the PAF had launched pre-emptive strikes on the evening of 3 December that led to the formal commencement of hostilities. In the western theatre, the town of Rahim Yar Khan, close to the international border, formed a critical communication centre for Khan's forces and, situated on the Sindh–Punjab railway, remained a vulnerable link in Khan's logistics. The fall of Rahim Yar Khan to Indian forces would cut off the railway as well as road link between Sindh and Punjab, starving Khan's forces of fuel and ammunition delivered to Karachi.

Indian battle plans called for a strike by the 12th Indian Division across the border towards Islamgarh through Sarkari Tala, subsequently advancing through Baghla to secure Rahim Yar Khan, which would not only destabilise the Pakistani defences in the Punjab, but also in the Jammu & Kashmir Sector, allowing the planned Indian offensive in the Shakargarh sector to sweep the Pakistani forces trapped there.

Pakistan, which envisaged the Punjab as an operational centre, had a strong intelligence network in the area and planned to counter its own comparatively weak strength on the ground with a pre-emptive strike through Kishangarh towards the divisional headquarters south of Ramgarh. Pakistani intelligence agents were able to infiltrate the operations area posing as local people and pass on information. However, these sources failed to pass on information on the Longewala post which, originally a BSF post, was now held by a company of the Punjab Regiment. Longewala formed a strategic point en route to capturing vast tracts of land and also a pivotal theatre of war in engaging India on the western front.

Tactical plan 
Pakistan's tactical plan was based on the assumption that an attack in the area would help Pakistan's 1st Armoured Division's task in the Sri Ganganagar area. Pakistan High command also felt that it was important to protect the north-south road link which they felt was vulnerable, as it was close to the border. A combined arms plan was decided upon. This involved two infantry brigades and two armoured regiments. A separate division, the 18th Division, was formed for this purpose. The 18th Division's operation orders required one infantry brigade (206th) with an armoured regiment (38th Cavalry) to capture and establish a firm base at Longewala, a junction on the Indian road system, and the 51st Infantry Brigade and the 22nd Cavalry (Pakistan Army Armoured Corps) to operate beyond Longewala to capture Jaisalmer.

The Pakistani plan was to reach Longewala, Ramgarh and Jaisalmer. The plan was far-fetched from the start, if only because it called for a night attack to be conducted over terrain that was not preceded by route or engineer reconnaissance, and the armoured troops were therefore unaware the ground could not support rapid movement towards the objective. As the day unfolded, Longewala would stand out as one of the biggest losses for Pakistan, despite overwhelming superiority before commencement of the battle, largely due to the vehicles becoming bogged down in soft sand.

Indian defensive planning 

On the Indian side, the post was held by A Company, 23rd Battalion, Punjab Regiment, led by Maj. Kuldip Singh Chandpuri, the defences occupying a high sand dune which dominated the area that was largely intractable to vehicles. The post was surrounded by a barbed wire fence of three strands. The rest of the battalion was located at Sadhewala,  to the north-east. Chandpuri commanded an infantry company reinforced by a section each of medium machine guns (MMGs) and L16 81mm mortars, and one Jonga-mounted recoilless rifle (RCL). His two other recoilless rifle teams of the anti-tank section were under training at battalion headquarters. Major Chandpuri also had under his command a four-man team of the camel Border Security Force division. The Longewala post had no armoured vehicles, but artillery support was available from a battery of the 170th Field Regiment, tasked with direct support of the battalion, and the 168th Field Regiment, which had been deployed to the area in secrecy just a day earlier. The direct support battery was attached to the 168th Field Regiment and served as its "Sierra" Battery. Immediately after PAF strikes on Indian airfields on 3 December, Chandpuri dispatched a 20-man-strong patrol under 2nd Lt. Dharam Veer to Boundary Pillar (BP) 638, on the border. This patrol was to play an important part in detecting the advances of Pakistani forces.

Battle 

During the night of the 4th, Dharam Veer's platoon, while on a patrol, detected noises across the border that suggested a large number of armoured vehicles approaching. These were soon confirmed by reports—from the Army's Air Observation Post aircraft flown by Maj. Atma Singh—in the area of a  armoured column on the track leading to the post advancing in the general direction of the Longewala post. Directing Dharam Veer Bhakri's patrol to trail the advancing armoured column, Chandpuri contacted battalion headquarters, requesting urgent reinforcements and armour and artillery support. Battalion headquarters gave him the choice of staying put and containing the attack as much as possible, or carrying out a tactical retreat to Ramgarh, as reinforcements would not be available that night. Considering that Chandpuri's command had all the transportation to retreat on time, he decided to stay and fight back the advancing enemy.

The Pakistani forces began their attack at 12:30 am. As the offensive approached the lone outpost, Pakistani artillery opened up across the border with medium artillery, killing five of the ten camels from the BSF detachment. As the column of 45 tanks neared the post, Indian defences, lacking the time to lay a prepared minefield, laid a hasty anti-tank minefield as the enemy advanced, one infantryman being killed in the process. The Indian infantry held their fire until the leading Pakistani tanks had approached to within  before firing their PIATs. They accounted for the first two tanks on the track with their Jonga-mounted 106 mm M40 recoilless rifle, with one of its crew being killed during the engagement. This weapon proved quite effective because it was able to engage the thinner top armour of the Pakistani tanks from its elevated position, firing at often stationary, bogged-down vehicles. In all, the post defenders claimed 12 tanks destroyed or damaged. The initial Pakistani attack stalled almost immediately when the infantry discovered the barbed wire which had not been spotted in the night, and interpreted it as signifying a minefield. Firing for the Indian RCL crews was made easier by the flames of fires when the spare fuel tanks on the Pakistani tanks, intended to supplement their internal capacity for the advance to Jaisalmer, exploded, providing ample light for Indians located on higher ground, and creating a dense, acrid smoke screen at ground level for the Pakistani infantry, adding to the confusion. Two hours were lost as Pakistani sappers were brought up, only to discover there was no minefield. However, at this time Pakistani infantry were required to make another attack, from a different direction, but in the dawn light. The Pakistani advance then attempted to surround the post two hours later by vehicles getting off the road, but many vehicles, particularly armoured personnel carriers and tanks, in trying to soften up the Indian defenders before attacking, became bogged down in the soft sand of the area surrounding the post. Throughout the engagement, Major Chandpuri continued to direct the supporting artillery fire.

Although massively outnumbering the Indian defenders and having surrounded them, the Pakistani troops were unable to advance over open terrain on a full-moon night, under small arms and mortar fire from the outpost. This encouraged the Indians not to give up their strong defensive position, frustrating the Pakistani commanders. As dawn arrived, the Pakistan forces had still not taken the post, and were now faced with doing so in full daylight.

In the morning, the Indian Air Force was finally able to direct some HAL HF-24 Maruts and Hawker Hunter aircraft to assist the post; they were not outfitted with night-vision equipment, and so had to wait until dawn. With daylight, however, the IAF was able to operate effectively, with the strike aircraft being guided to targets by the airborne Forward Air Controller (FAC), Maj. Atma Singh in a HAL Krishak. The Indian aircraft attacked the Pakistani ground troops with 16 Matra T-10 rockets and 30 mm cannon on each aircraft. Without support from the Pakistan Air Force, which was busy elsewhere, the tanks and other armoured vehicles were easy targets for the IAF's Hunters. The range of the 12.7 mm anti-aircraft heavy machine guns mounted on the tanks was limited and therefore ineffective against the Indian jets. Indian air attacks were made easier by the barren terrain. Many IAF officers later described the attack as a "turkey shoot", signifying the lopsidedness. By noon the next day, the assault ended completely, having cost Pakistan 22 tanks claimed destroyed by aircraft fire, 12 by ground anti-tank fire, and some captured after being abandoned, with a total of 100 vehicles claimed to have been destroyed or damaged in the desert around the post. The Pakistani forces were forced to withdraw when Indian tanks from the division's cavalry regiment, the 20th Lancers, commanded by Col. Bawa Guruvachan Singh, along with the 17th Battalion, Rajputana Rifles, launched their counter-offensive to end the six-hour engagement. Longewala had proved to be one of the defining moments in the war.

Aftermath 
Since the Indians were on the defensive, they managed to inflict heavy losses on the Pakistanis: 200 soldiers killed, 36 tanks destroyed or abandoned, and 500 additional vehicles lost. The Pakistani judicial commission set up at the end of war recommended the commander of 18 Division, Maj. Gen. Mustafa, be tried for negligence.

Notwithstanding the Indian victory, there were intelligence and strategic failures on both sides. India's intelligence service failed to provide warning of such a large armoured force in the western sector. Moreover, the defending post was not heavily armed. Finally, they did not push home their advantage and destroy the fleeing Pakistani tanks while the IAF had them on the run. They did, however, destroy or capture some 36 tanks, one of the most disproportionate tank losses for one side in a single battle after World War II.

The Pakistani troops, meanwhile, had underestimated the post's defensive capability due to the difficulty of approach over sand, conducting the attack at night and in full-moon light, against stiff resistance from a well-prepared defensive position located on a dominant height. Attacking with virtually no air cover, they took too long to close for an assault on the position, and failed to anticipate the availability of Indian close air support. Given that Pakistan's Sherman tanks and T-59/Type 59 Chinese tanks were slow on the sandy Thar Desert, some military analysts have opined that the attack may have been poorly planned and executed, given the terrain. Some Pakistani tanks suffered engine failure due to overheating in trying to extricate themselves, and were abandoned. The open desert battleground provided little to no cover for the tanks and infantry from air attacks. The plan to capture Longewala may have been good in conception, but failed due to lack of air cover. As a result, two tank regiments failed to take Longewala.

For his part, the Indian company commander, Maj. (later Brig.) Kuldip Singh Chandpuri, was decorated with India's second-highest gallantry award, the Maha Vir Chakra. Several other awards were earned by members of the defending company and the battalion's commander. On the other hand, the Pakistani divisional commander was dismissed from service. However, the commander of the Pakistani 51 Brigade who mounted the daring attack and crossed into Indian territory was later awarded Pakistan's high award, the Sitara-e-Imtiaz.

British media reported the defence of Longewala. James Hatter compared the Battle of Longewala to Battle of Thermopylae in his article Taking on the enemy at Longewala, describing it as the deciding moment of the 1971 war. Similarly, Field Marshal R. M. Carver, the British Chief of the Imperial General Staff, visited Longewala a few weeks after the war to learn the details of the battle from Maj. Chandpuri.

In 2008, the battle was the subject of disagreement, some officers of the time ascribing all the combat success to the air force. This led to Kuldip Singh Chandpuri suing for the token amount of one rupee.

In popular culture 
The Battle of Longewala was depicted in the 1997 Bollywood film Border, which was directed by J. P. Dutta and starred Sunny Deol as Maj. Kuldip Singh Chandpuri, Jackie Shroff as Wg. Cdr. M.S. Bawa, Sunil Shetty as Assistant Commandant Bhairon Singh (BSF), and Akshaye Khanna as 2 Lt. Dharam Veer. The main criticism of the movie was that it showed Indian forces being in a terrible position before any sort of help came from the Indian Air Force. The movie also exaggerates the Indian casualties for dramatic purposes.

See also 

 Indo-Pakistani War of 1971
 Timeline of the Bangladesh Liberation War
 Military plans of the Bangladesh Liberation War
 Mitro Bahini order of battle
 Pakistan Army order of battle, December 1971
 Battle of Chamb
 Evolution of Pakistan Eastern Command plan
 1971 Bangladesh genocide
 Operation Searchlight
 Indo-Pakistani wars and conflicts
 Military history of India
 List of military disasters
 List of wars involving India

Citations and notes

References 
 Indivisible Air Power, Strategic Analysis, Institute for Defence Studies and Analyses, 1984, v.8, 1185–1202
 Imprint, Justified Press, 1972, v.12:7–12 (Oct 1972 – Mar 1973)
 Alter, Stephen, Amritsar to Lahore: A Journey Across the India-Pakistan Border, University of Pennsylvania Press, 2000
 Nordeen, Lon O., Air Warfare in the Missile Age, Smithsonian Institution Press, 1985
 Suresh, Kukke, Wg. Cdr. (Retd), Battle of Longewala: 5 and 6 December 1971, 1971 India Pakistan Operations, http://www.bharat-rakshak.com
 Sharma, Gautam, Valour and Sacrifice: Famous Regiments of the Indian Army, Allied Publishers, 1990

Further reading 
 Anil Shorey Pakistan's Failed Gamble: The Battle of Laungewala Manas, 2005, .
 Brigadier Zafar Alam Khan The Way It Was. He was probably the commanding officer of the 22nd Armoured Regiment.
 Virendra Verma, Hunting hunters: Battle of Longewala, December 1971: a study in joint army-air operations (Stories of war in post-independence India), Youth Education Publications, 1992

External links 
 The battle from the Indian Air Force Journal, 1997
 The Western Theatre in 1971;— A Strategic and Operational Analysis by A.H. Amin – Orbat

Longewala 1971
Indo-Pakistani War of 1971
1971 in India
1971 in Pakistan
Aerial operations and battles involving India
December 1971 events in Asia